This is the Operation Herrick ground order of battle, which lists any British ground forces that have taken part in the duration of Operation Herrick between 2002 and 2014.

Operation Herrick 0-10
Operation Herrick began in 2002 on the end of Operation Fingal, which saw Britain hand command of the ISAF force to Turkey. At that point, the deployment was scaled back from 2,100 to approximately 300, primarily concerned with security in Kabul, and manning the UK Afghan National Army Training Team (UKANATT). In 2003, the deployment in Kabul was expanded to battalion size when two Provincial Reconstruction Teams were established, along with a rapid reaction force, based around a light role infantry battalion, the Afghanistan Roulement Infantry Battalion (ARIB). In January 2006, the Government announced that, due to the worsening situation in the south of Afghanistan, a brigade sized formation numbering approximately 3,300, Task Force Helmand, would be deployed to Helmand Province.

Operation Herrick

April 2004 - September 2004:
 Deputy Commander, Combined Force Command, Afghanistan: Major-General John Cooper (May 2004 to December 2004)
 1st Battalion, The Green Howards (Alexandra, Princess of Wales's Own Yorkshire Regiment)

Operation Herrick I

October 2004 - March 2005:
 Deputy Commander, Combined Force Command, Afghanistan: Major-General John Cooper (October 2004 to December 2004)
 Deputy Commander, Combined Force Command, Afghanistan: Major-General Peter Gilchrist (December 2004 to March 2005)
 1st Battalion, The Worcestershire and Sherwood Foresters Regiment (29th/45th Foot)

Operation Herrick II

April 2005 - September 2005:
 Deputy Commander, Combined Force Command, Afghanistan: Major-General Peter Gilchrist (April 2005 to September 2005)
 2nd Battalion, Royal Gurkha Rifles

Operation Herrick III

October 2005 - March 2006:
 Deputy Commander, Combined Force Command, Afghanistan: Major-General Peter Gilchrist (October 2005 to December 2005)
 Deputy Commander, Combined Force Command, Afghanistan: Major-General Christopher Wilson (January 2006 to March 2006)
 1st Battalion, Royal Gloucestershire, Berkshire and Wiltshire Regiment
 Support Company
 Elements of 7th Signal Regiment

Operation Herrick IV

April 2006 – September 2006:
 Deputy Commander, Combined Force Command, Afghanistan: Major-General Christopher Wilson (April 2006 to September 2006)
HQ, 16 Air Assault Brigade
Headquarters Allied Rapid Reaction Corps Support Battalion
British Forces Transport Troop
Principal Manoeuvre Units
3rd Battalion, The Parachute Regiment
 A Company 
 B Company & 6 (Guards) Platoon
 C Company & Ranger Platoon 
 Support Company
1st Battalion, The Royal Irish Regiment (27th (Inniskilling), 83rd, 87th and Ulster Defence Regiment)
Somme Platoon
Barrosa Platoon
Patrols Platoon
Ranger Platoon
Reconnaissance Platoon
ANA & ANP Mentoring
 7th Parachute Regiment Royal Horse Artillery
Logistics HQ
Commando Logistic Regiment
Other units
Easy Company
Somme Platoon from 1st Battalion, Royal Irish Regiment
Barrosa Platoon from 1st Battalion, Royal Irish Regiment
 Ad hoc company headquarters from 3 PARA
 Pathfinder Platoon
 Household Cavalry Regiment
 D Squadron (Formation Reconnaissance Squadron)
Argyll and Sutherland Highlanders, 5th Battalion the Royal Regiment of Scotland
 B Company
Royal Artillery
5th Regiment Royal Artillery 
Unknown Battery (STA)
4/73 (Sphinx) Special Observation Post Battery RA** Fire Support Team 
 32nd Regiment Royal Artillery
 18 (Quebec 1759) Battery
Royal Engineers
 23 Engineer Regiment (Air Assault), Royal Engineers
 51 Parachute Squadron
 8 Troop (Made up of attached personnel from 9 Parachute Squadron RE)
 Elements of 33 Engineer Regiment RE
39 Engineer Regiment RE
 53 Field Squadron
 48 Field Squadron
Royal Logistic Corps
Elements of 11 Explosive Ordnance Disposal Regiment RLC
13 Air Assault Support Regiment RLC
29 Regiment RLC
Royal Signals
216 Signal Squadron
Elements of 14th Signal Regiment (Electronic Warfare)
Royal Electrical and Mechanical Engineers
7 Air Assault Battalion REME 
8 Close Support Squadron
Royal Army Medical Corps
16 Close Support Medical Regiment, Royal Army Medical Corps
Royal Military Police
1st Regiment, Royal Military Police
114 Provost Company
4 Regiment Royal Military Police
156 Provost Company (Air Assault)
Theatre Reserve Battalion
2nd Battalion, Royal Regiment of Fusiliers

Operation Herrick V

October 2006 - April 2007:
 Deputy Commander, Combined Force Command, Afghanistan: Major-General Christopher Wilson (October 2006 to December 2006)
 Commander, International Security Assistance Force: General Sir David Richards (December 2006 to April 2007)
HQ, 3 Commando Brigade
ANA & ANP Mentoring
45 Commando, Royal Marines
 Whiskey Company
 Zulu Company
Logistics HQ
Commando Logistic Regiment
Other units
The Light Dragoons
 C Squadron
42 Commando, Royal Marines
 Juliet Company
 Kilo Company
 Mike Company
 10 Troop
 11 Troop
 Reconnaissance Troop
32nd Regiment Royal Artillery
 42 (Alem Hamza) Battery UAVs
29th Commando Regiment Royal Artillery
 7 (Sphinx) Battery Royal Artillery
 148 Commando Forward Observation Battery Royal Artillery
28 Engineer Regiment RE
59 Independent Commando Squadron, Royal Engineers
Elements of 33 Engineer Regiment RE
Elements of 11 Explosive Ordnance Disposal Regiment RLC
27 Transport Regiment RLC
29 Regiment RLC
 2nd Medical Brigade, Royal Army Medical Corps
 22 Field Hospital
 3 Regiment RMP
 174 Provost Company
 Elements of The 2nd Battalion Royal Regiment of Fusiliers (Theatre Reserve Battalion)
 The Rifle Volunteers/6 Rifles (TA)
 Peninsula Company

Operation Herrick VI

April 2007 – October 2007:
 Commander, International Security Assistance Force: General Sir David Richards (April 2007 to October 2007)
HQ, 12 Mechanised Brigade
Principal Manoeuvre Unit
1st Battalion, The Worcestershire and Sherwood Foresters Regiment (29th/45th Foot)
 B Company
 C Company
 D (Fire Support) Company
ANA & ANP Mentoring
1st Battalion, Grenadier Guards
 Inkerman Company
 The Queen's Company
Other units
 12 Mechanized Brigade Reconnaissance Force (12 BRF)
 1 Platoon
 2 Platoon
 B Troop 4/73 (Sphinx) Special Observation Post Battery RA (Detached)
The Light Dragoons
 B Squadron
2nd Royal Tank Regiment
 Falcon Squadron
1st Battalion, The Royal Anglian Regiment - first unit in Afghanistan to the use the new "Vector" protected patrol vehicle
 A (Norfolk) Company 
 B (Suffolk) Company
 No 3 (Fighting) Company 1st Battalion The Grenadier Guards. Company was raised specifically for Herrick 6 and came under command of 1st Battalion The Royal Anglian Regiment. Company was disbanded once more on return to UK. 
 7 Platoon
Elements of 16th Regiment Royal Artillery
19th Regiment Royal Artillery
 5 (Gibraltar 1779–1783) Battery
32nd Regiment Royal Artillery
 57 (Bhurtpore) Battery Royal Artillery UAVs
39th Regiment Royal Artillery
 Unknown Troop of MLRS
26 Engineer Regiment RE
Elements of 33 Engineer Regiment RE
Elements of 11 Explosive Ordnance Disposal Regiment RLC
4 Logistic Support Regiment RLC
871 Postal & Courier Squadron RLC 
Elements of 152 (Ulster) Transport Regt RLC
4 General Support Medical Regiment
 2nd Medical Brigade, Royal Army Medical Corps
212 Field Hospital 
Somme Company, composed mainly of elements of The London Regiment, also a platoon of Grenadier Guards and individual members of the Reserve Forces.
In February 2007, it was announced that an additional 1,400 troops would be deployed to Afghanistan, primarily formed as a battlegroup around a light infantry battalion, the 1st Battalion The Royal Welsh (Royal Welch Fusiliers).
*Renamed as 2nd Battalion, The Mercian Regiment (Worcesters and Foresters) 01/09/07

Operation Herrick VII

November 2007 - April 2008:
 Commander, International Security Assistance Force: General Sir David Richards (November 2007 to November 2007)
 Deputy Commander, International Security Assistance Force: Major-General Jonathon Riley (December 2007 to April 2008)
HQ 52 Infantry Brigade - deployment first reported November 2006.
 258 Signal Squadron Royal Corps of Signals - Bde HQ
ANA & ANP Mentoring
 2nd Battalion, The Yorkshire Regiment (14th/15th, 19th and 33rd/76th Foot) (Green Howards) 
 OMLT 2 - B (KH) Company
Other units
Household Cavalry Regiment
 C Squadron
 D Squadron
A Squadron, Queens Royal Lancers, Viking Armoured Support Group
40 Commando, Royal Marines - Camp Bastion (Battle Group North)
 Alpha Company - FOB Inkerman
 Bravo Company - Sangin
 Charlie Company - COB Zeebrugge/Kajaki Dam
 Delta Company - Now Zad
 Echo Company - FOB Robinson
1st Battalion, Coldstream Guards
 Unknown Platoon, No. 2 Company
 No. 10 Platoon, No. 3 Company
 Sniper Section
 Support Company
1st Battalion, Scots Guards
 Right Flank
 Elements of Number 2 Company Coldstream Guards
Attached to Right flank as dismounted infantry
1st Battalion, The Royal Gurkha Rifles
Salonika Company, The Rifles
4th Regiment Royal Artillery
32nd Regiment Royal Artillery
 18 (Quebec 1759) Battery RA UAVs
39th Regiment Royal Artillery
 Unknown Troop of M270 Multiple Launch Rocket System
36 Engineer Regiment RE
 20 Field Squadron
Elements of 33 Engineer Regiment RE
 21 Field Squadron (EOD)
Elements of 170 (Infrastructure Support) Engineer Group RE
 Kings Royal Hussars
 B Squadron using Mastiff's
Elements of 11 Explosive Ordnance Disposal Regiment RLC
Elements of 14 Signal Regiment (Electronic Warfare)
27 Transport Regiment RLC
5 General Support Medical Regiment
1st Battalion, Royal Electrical and Mechanical Engineers
101 Provost Company, Royal Military Police

Operation Herrick VIII

May 2008 – October 2008:
 Deputy Commander, International Security Assistance Force: Major-General Jonathon Riley (May 2008 to October 2008)
HQ 16 Air Assault Brigade
ANA Mentoring
1st Battalion, The Royal Irish Regiment (27th (Inniskilling), 83rd, 87th and Ulster Defence Regiment) 
Imjin Company
Elements of C troop from C Battery 3rd Royal Horse Artillery
ANP Mentoring
 Police Reform Cell
 Royal Military Police - Police Mentoring Team (PMT)
Other units
Household Cavalry Regiment
 D Squadron
Queen's Royal Lancers
 A Squadron
 Viking Squadron
The Royal Highland Fusiliers, 2nd Battalion The Royal Regiment of Scotland
The Highlanders, 4th Battalion The Royal Regiment of Scotland
 Bravo Company
The Argyll and Sutherland Highlanders, 5th Battalion The Royal Regiment of Scotland
2nd Battalion, The Parachute Regiment
B Company
C (Bruneval) Company 
D Company - Strike operations roll
3rd Battalion, The Parachute Regiment
 A Company
 B Company
 Guards' Parachute Platoon
7th (Parachute) Regiment Royal Horse Artillery
32nd Regiment Royal Artillery 42(Alem Hamza) Battery
39th Regiment Royal Artillery
Unknown Troop of MLRS
23 (Air Assault) Regiment RE
Elements of 33 Engineer Regiment RE
Elements of 170 (Infrastructure Support) Engineer Group, Royal Engineers
Elements of 11 Explosive Ordnance Disposal Regiment RLC
13 Air Assault Support Regiment RLC
6 Supply Regiment RLC
16 Close Support Medical Regiment
7th Battalion, Royal Electrical and Mechanical Engineers
*Elements of the Theatre Reserve Battalion, B Company, 1st Battalion The Royal Welsh (Royal Welch Fusiliers), then 2nd Battalion The Princess of Wales's Royal Regiment (Queen's and Royal Hampshires) were deployed in support of both 16 Air Assault Brigade and 3 Commando Brigade

Operation Herrick IX

November 2008 - April 2009:
 Deputy Commander, International Security Assistance Force: Major-General James Dutton (November 2008 to April 2009)
HQ 3 Commando Brigade
Principal Manoeuvre Units
 42 Commando, Royal Marines - Kandahar Air Field
 Juliet Company - FOB Argyll (Force protection in Kabul and Lashkar Gah)
 45 Commando, Royal Marines (Battle Group North in the Upper Sangin Valley)
 Victor Company - Kajaki Dam
 Whiskey Company - FOB Jackson
 X-Ray Company - FOB Nolay
 Yankee Company - FOB Inkerman
 Zulu Company - FOB Gibraltar
 1st The Queen's Dragoon Guards (Battle Group South at Garmsir)
 2nd Battalion, Royal Gurkha Rifles (Battle Group North West at Musa Qal'eh and Now Zad)
ANA Mentoring
1st Battalion, The Rifles with additional members from 6 RIFLES
 C Company (Mentored 4th Kandak, 3rd Brigade, 205th Corps)
ANP Mentoring
 Royal Military Police
 2nd Battalion, Royal Gurkha Rifles PMT
Other units
 Information Exploration Group (IX Group)
 Brigade Reconnaissance Force (BRF)
 57 (Bhurtpore) Battery, Royal Artillery UAV Battery from 32nd Regiment Royal Artillery
2nd Battalion, The Royal Welsh (Royal Regiment of Wales)
Household Cavalry Regiment
1st Battalion, The Princess of Wales's Royal Regiment
 1 Armoured Infantry company group
2nd Battalion, The Princess of Wales's Royal Regiment (Theatre Reserve Battalion deployment)
29th Commando Regiment Royal Artillery
39th Regiment Royal Artillery 
 74 Battery (The Battle Axe Company) Royal Artillery using MLRS
24 (Commando) Regiment RE
35 Engineer Regiment RE
77 Armoured Engineer Squadron
Elements of 33 Engineer Regiment RE
Elements of 170 (Infrastructure Support) Engineer Group, Royal Engineers
Elements of 11 Explosive Ordnance Disposal Regiment RLC
Commando Logistic Regiment, Royal Marines
Elements of 17 Port And Maritime Regiment RLC 
United Kingdom Landing Force Command Support Group, Royal Marines
539 Assault Squadron RM
Armoured Support Group
Royal Marines Band Service
3rd Battalion, Royal Electrical and Mechanical Engineers

Operation Herrick 10-20

Operation Herrick X

May 2009 – October 2009:
 Deputy Commander, International Security Assistance Force: Major-General James Dutton (May 2009 to October 2009)
HQ 19 Light Brigade
Principal Manoeuvre Units
2nd Royal Tank Regiment
 Egypt Squadron
The Light Dragoons
1st Battalion, Welsh Guards
 No. 2 Company
2nd Battalion, The Royal Welsh (Royal Regiment of Wales)
 A Company
The Black Watch, 3rd Battalion The Royal Regiment of Scotland - Brigade Reconnaissance Force
2nd Battalion, The Rifles
4th Battalion, The Rifles
 B Company
 R Company
2nd Battalion, The Royal Regiment of Fusiliers
ANA Mentoring
2nd Battalion, Mercian Regiment (Worcesters and Foresters)
 B Company
ANP Mentoring
 Police Operational Mentoring and Liaison Team (POMLT)
 2nd Battalion, Royal Gurkha Rifles
 F Company
Other units
5th Regiment Royal Artillery
 Unknown Battery (STA)
40th Regiment Royal Artillery
32nd Regiment Royal Artillery
39th Regiment Royal Artillery
Unknown Troop of M270 Multiple Launch Rocket System
Elements of 33 Engineer Regiment RE
38 Engineer Regiment RE
Elements of 170 (Infrastructure Support) Engineer Group, Royal Engineers
Theatre Logistics Group - 4 Logistic Support Regiment
Elements of 11 Explosive Ordnance Disposal Regiment RLC
17 Port and Maritime Regiment RLC, Royal Logistic Corps (Kabul)
27 Regiment RLC
 91 Supply Squadron
19 Combat Service Support Battalion, Royal Electrical and Mechanical Engineers (REME)
4th Battalion REME, 
2nd Medical Regiment
4th Battalion, The Mercian Regiment
 Normandy Company
Elements of 5th Battalion Royal Regiment of Fusiliers (Kabul)
173rd Provost Company Royal Military Police

Operation Herrick XI

November 2009 - April 2010:
 Deputy Commander, International Security Assistance Force: Major-General Nicholas Parker (November 2009 to April 2010)
HQ 11 Light Brigade
Principal Manoeuvre Units
The Household Cavalry Regiment
A, B and C Squadrons
1st Battalion, Grenadier Guards
 Queen's Company
 No. 2 Company
 The Inkerman Company
 5 Platoon
1st Battalion, Coldstream Guards
3rd Battalion, The Rifles
1st Battalion, The Royal Welsh (Royal Welch Fusiliers)
2nd Battalion, The Royal Welsh (Royal Regiment of Wales)
 A Company
ANA Mentoring
2nd Battalion, The Yorkshire Regiment (14th/15th, 19th & 33rd/76th Foot) (Green Howards)
ANP Mentoring
1st Battalion, The Royal Anglian Regiment
 No. 3 Company
 4th Regiment Royal Military Police
 160 Provost Company
Other units
1st Royal Tank Regiment
 D Squadron
Elements of 2nd Royal Tank Regiment
4th Battalion The Rifles
A Company
1st Battalion The Royal Regiment of Scotland
B Company
1st Regiment Royal Horse Artillery
28 Engineer Regiment RE
Elements of 33 Engineer Regiment RE
Elements of 101 (City of London) Engineer Regiment RE
Elements of 170 (Infra Sp) Engineer Group, Royal Engineers
Elements of 11 Explosive Ordnance Disposal Regiment RLC
104 Battalion Royal Electrical and Mechanical Engineers
10 Queen's Own Gurkha Logistic Regiment RLC
261 Signals Squadron, Royal Corps of Signals
5th Regiment Royal Artillery
K 'Hondeghem' Bty (STA) 
Elements of 256 (City of London) Field Hospital
Theatre Logistics Group - 9 Regiment RLC

In October 2009, the total force was increased to 9,000 personnel with the addition of several other units:
1st Battalion, Coldstream Guards
1st Battalion, The Royal Anglian Regiment
 No. 3 Company
3rd Battalion, The Royal Anglian Regiment
 12 Platoon
2nd Battalion, The Duke of Lancaster's Regiment (King's, Lancashire & Border)
 No. 1 Company
1st Battalion, The Royal Regiment of Scotland
 No. 1 Company

Operation Herrick XII

May 2010 - October 2010:
 Deputy Commander, International Security Assistance Force: Major-General Nicholas Parker (May 2010 to September 2010)
 Deputy Commander, International Security Assistance Force: Major-General James Bucknall (September 2010 to October 2010)
HQ 4 Mechanized Brigade
204 Signal Squadron Royal Signals
Principal Manoeuvre Units
Queen's Royal Lancers 
40 Commando, Royal Marines
 Bravo Company
 4 Troop
 Charlie Company
 7 Troop
 Delta Company
1st Battalion, The Royal Gurkha Rifles
1st Battalion, The Duke of Lancaster's Regiment (King's, Lancashire and Border)
 1st Battalion, Scots Guards
ANA Mentoring
 Brigade Advisory Group (BAG)
 The Royal Scots Borderers, 1st Battalion The Royal Regiment of Scotland
ANP Mentoring
 Police Mentoring and Advisory Group (PMAG)
 1st Battalion, The Mercian Regiment (Cheshire)
Other units
Royal Dragoon Guards
 A SQN 
 C SQN
 D SQN The Green Horse 
4th Regiment Royal Artillery
21 Engineer Regiment RE
Elements of 33 Engineer Regiment RE
Elements of 11 Explosive Ordnance Disposal Regiment RLC
3 Medical Regiment
34 Field Hospital
1st Battalion, Royal Electrical and Mechanical Engineers
101st Battalion, Royal Electrical and Mechanical Engineers
12 Close Support Logistic Regiment (CSLR) - based on 12 Logistic Support Regiment, Royal Logistic Corps (since disbanded)
Elements of 23 Pioneer Regiment (Force Protection Platoon, 12 CSLR) (since disbanded)
Elements of 150 Regiment, Royal Logistic Corps (integrated within 12 CSLR)
Theatre Logistics Group - 8 Regiment RLC
Weapon Intelligence Specialist Company
2nd Battalion, Arnhem Coy The Duke of Lancaster's Regiment (King's, Lancashire & Border)
Theatre Provost Group: 150 Provost Company, 1st Regiment Royal Military Police, supported by 101 and 243 Provost Companys, 5th Regiment Royal Military Police and the Tactical Provost Wing, Royal Air Force Police.

Operation Herrick XIII

November 2010 - April 2011:
 Deputy Commander, International Security Assistance Force: Major-General James Bucknall (November 2010 to April 2011)
HQ, 16 Air Assault Brigade
216 Parachute Signal Squadron
Principal Manoeuvre Units
2nd Royal Tank Regiment
 Badger Squadron
 Cyclops Squadron
 Falcon Squadron
2nd Battalion, The Parachute Regiment
3rd Battalion, The Parachute Regiment
1st Battalion, The Royal Irish Regiment (27th (Inniskilling), 83rd, 87th and Ulster Defence Regiment)
The Royal Highland Fusiliers, 2nd Battalion The Royal Regiment of Scotland
 B Company
ANA Mentoring
 BAG
 1st Battalion, Irish Guards
ANP Mentoring
 PMAG
 The Argyll and Sutherland Highlanders, 5th Battalion The Royal Regiment of Scotland
Other units
Household Cavalry Regiment
 D Squadron
Elements of 4th Battalion, The Parachute Regiment Arnhem Company
Elements of 2nd Battalion, The Royal Irish Regiment Barrossa Company
Elements of 4th Battalion, Duke of Lancaster's Regiment Corunna Company
5th Regiment Royal Artillery
Z Battery (STA)
7th (Parachute) Regiment Royal Horse Artillery
32nd Regiment Royal Artillery
 Unknown battery of UAVs
39th Regiment Royal Artillery 
 Unknown Troop of MLRS
23 (Air Assault) Regiment RE
 9 Parachute Squadron RE
 51 Parachute Squadron RE
 5 Armoured Squadron RE attached
Elements of 33 Engineer Regiment RE
Elements of 101 (City of London) Engineer Regiment RE
Elements of 170 (Infra Sp) Engineer Group, Royal Engineers
Elements of 11 Explosive Ordnance Disposal Regiment RLC
Theatre Logistics Group - 17 Port and Maritime Regiment RLC
13 Air Assault Support Regiment RLC
9 Regiment RLC
 95 Squadron RLC
6 Supply Regiment RLC
16 Medical Regiment
 207 (Manchester) Field Hospital
 212 (Sheffield) Field Hospital 
7th Battalion, Royal Electrical and Mechanical Engineers

Operation Herrick XIV

May – October 2011:
 Deputy Commander, International Security Assistance Force: Major-General James Bucknall (May 2011 to October 2011)
HQ 3 Commando Brigade
Principal Manoeuvre Units
 Brigade Reconnaissance Force
1st Battalion, The Rifles
 A Company.
 B Company 
 C Company.
 S Company.
42 Commando, Royal Marines
Juliet Company
Lima Company
Mike Company
45 Commando, Royal Marines
The Highlanders, 4th Battalion The Royal Regiment of Scotland
 B Company.
ANA Mentoring
 BAG
 3rd Battalion, The Mercian Regiment (Staffords)
ANP Mentoring
 PMAG
 2nd Battalion, The Royal Gurkha Rifles
 A Company.
Other units
The Royal Scots Dragoon Guards (Carabiniers and Greys)
[[9th/12th Royal Lancers|The 9th/12th Royal Lancers (''Prince of Wales)]]
30 Commando (IX), Royal Marines
29 (Commando) Regiment, Royal Artillery
53 (Louisburg) Battery RA
24 Commando Engineer Regiment RE
32 Engineer Regiment RE
Elements of 28 Engineer Regiment
39 Armoured Engineer Squadron
32 Regiment, Royal Artillery 
Elements of 33 Engineer Regiment RE
Elements of 11 Explosive Ordnance Disposal Regiment RLC
Commando Logistic Regiment, Royal Marines
2 Close Support Battalion, Royal Electrical and Mechanical Engineers

Operation Herrick XV

November 2011 - April 2012:
 Deputy Commander, International Security Assistance Force: Major-General Adrian Bradshaw (November 2011 to April 2012)
HQ 20th Armoured Brigade
 Brigade Reconnaissance Force
 Elements of 1st Battalion, The Yorkshire Regiment
 Elements of 1st The Queen's Dragoon GuardsPrincipal Manoeuvre Units The Queen's Royal Hussars (Queen's Own and Royal Irish)
 5th Battalion, The Rifles
 The Black Watch, 3rd Battalion The Royal Regiment of Scotland
 1st Battalion, Grenadier Guards
 2nd Battalion, The Mercian Regiment (Worcesters & Foresters)ANA Mentoring BAG
 2nd Battalion, The RiflesANP Mentoring PMAG
 1st Battalion, The Princess of Wales's Royal RegimentOther units1st The Queen's Dragoon Guards
1st Battalion, The Yorkshire Regiment (Prince of Wales's Own)
 A Company attached to 3 SCOTS
 B Company attached to the Danish Army
 C Company attached to the Danish Army
 Support Company attached to the Queen's Royal Hussars
 Headquarters staff attached to Task Force Helmand Headquarters.
35 Engineer Regiment RE
38 Engineer Regiment RE
 11 Field Squadron
Elements of 39 Engineer Regiment Royal Engineers
1 Logistic Support Regiment RLC
1 Medical Regiment
3 Close Support Battalion, Royal Electrical & Mechanical Engineers
110 Provost Company
 Elements of 33 Engineer Regiment RE
 Elements 170 Infra Sp Engr Gp Royal Engineers
5th Regiment Royal Artillery
K 'Hondeghem' Bty (STA)
10 (Assaye Battery) 47th Regiment Royal Artillery
 26 Regiment Royal Artillery (16 Battery Sandhams Company)

Operation Herrick XVI

May 2012 - October 2012:
 Deputy Commander, International Security Assistance Force: Major-General Adrian Bradshaw (May 2012 to September 2012)
 Deputy Commander, International Security Assistance Force: Major-General Nick Carter (September 2012 to October 2012)
HQ 12 Mechanised BrigadePrincipal Manoeuvre Units The King's Royal Hussars - HQ at MOB Lashkar Gah
 B Squadron
 1st Battalion, Grenadier Guards
 3rd Battalion, The Yorkshire Regiment (14th/15th, 19th and 33rd/76th Foot) (Duke of Wellington's)
 Prince Wales’s Company of 1st Battalion, Welsh Guards (Working as the operations company attached to the 3rd Battalion The Yorkshire Regiment)
 1st Battalion, The Royal Anglian Regiment
 A (Norfolk) Company
 B (Suffolk) Company
 C (Essex) CompanyANA Mentoring BAG
 3rd Battalion, The Rifles Locations at:
 Camp Tombstone, Camp Bastion
 Camp Shorabak, Camp BastionANP Mentoring PMAG
 1st Battalion, The Royal Welsh (Royal Welch Fusiliers) at MOB Lashkar Gah
 No. 2 Company
 174 Provost Company, Royal Military Police.
 7 (Royal Air Force Police) SquadronBRF B Squadron The Light Dragoons and Soldiers from Welsh Guards, RLC and American EODOther unitsThe Light Dragoons
 A Squadron
4 Close Support Battalion, Royal Electrical and Mechanical Engineers
1st Royal Tank Regiment
19th Regiment Royal Artillery
Elements of 5th Regiment Royal Artillery
 P Battery (The Dragon Troop) Royal Artillery (STA)
32nd Regiment Royal Artillery
 Desert Hawk III UAV
 Honeywell T-Hawk MAV
 Watchkeeper UAV
26 Engineer Regiment RE at Camp Bastion
33 Engineer Regiment (EOD) RE
4 Logistic Support Regiment RLC
24 Postal, Courier & Movements Regiment RLC
4 Medical Regiment, Royal Army Medical Corps
228 Signals Squadron

Operation Herrick XVII

November 2012 - April 2013:
 Deputy Commander, International Security Assistance Force: Major-General Nick Carter (November 2012 to April 2013)
HQ 4th Mechanized Brigade Headquarters and Signal Squadron (204) 
HQ 104 Logistic Support Brigade Principal Manoeuvre Units The Queen's Royal Lancers
 1st Battalion, Scots Guards
 40 Commando, Royal Marines
 Alpha Company
 1st Battalion, The Mercian Regiment (Cheshire)
 1st Battalion, The Duke of Lancaster's RegimentANA Mentoring BAG
 The Royal Scots Borderers, 1st Battalion The Royal Regiment of Scotland
 Delta CompanyANP Mentoring PMAG
 The Royal Dragoon GuardsOther units 1st Battalion, The Royal Gurkha Rifles
 Elements of The Honourable Artillery Company 
 Elements of The Royal Mercian and Lancastrian Yeomanry 
 Elements of 6th Battalion The Royal Regiment of Scotland 
 Elements of 3rd Battalion The Princess of Wales's Royal Regiment 
 Elements of 4th Battalion The Duke of Lancaster's Regiment 
 Elements of 4th Battalion The Mercian Regiment 
 Elements of The London Regiment Royal Artillery 4th Regiment Royal Artillery
 Elements of 5th Regiment Royal Artillery
 93 (Le Cateau) Battery
 Elements of 16 Regiment Royal Artillery
 Elements of 32 Regiment Royal Artillery
 Elements of 39 Regiment Royal Artillery 
 Elements of 101 Regiment Royal ArtilleryRoyal Engineers 21 Engineer Regiment RE
 Elements of 28 Engineer Regiment 
 Elements of 36 Engineer Regiment (Search) 
 Elements of 42 Engineer Regiment (Geographic) 
 Elements of 75 Engineer Regiment
 Elements of 101 (City of London) Engineer Regiment (Explosive Ordnance Disposal) 
 Elements of 170 (Infrastructure Support) Engineer Group Royal Logistic Corps Elements of 6 Regiment RLC
 7 Regiment RLC
 Elements of 9 Regiment RLC
 Elements of 11 Explosive Ordnance Disposal Regiment RLC
 12 Logistic Support Regiment RLC
 Elements of 17 Port and Maritime Regiment RLC
 Elements of 23 Pioneer Regiment RLC
 Elements of 29 Regiment RLC
 Elements of 148 Expeditionary Force Institute Squadron RLC  
 Elements of 150 (Yorkshire) Transport Regiment  RLC
 Elements of 159 Supply Regiment RLCRoyal Signals 2 Signal Regiment
 Elements of 10 Signal Regiment
 Elements of 14 Signal Regiment (Electronic Warfare) 
 Elements of 15 Signal Regiment (Information Support)
 Elements of 21 Signal Regiment (Air Support) 
 Elements of 32 Signal RegimentRoyal Electrical and Mechanical Engineers 1 Close Support Battalion REME
 Elements of 7 Air Assault Battalion REME
 Elements of 101 Force Support Battalion REME
 Elements of 102 Battalion REME 
 Elements of 103 Battalion REME Medical 3 Medical Regiment
 Elements of 204 (Northern Irish) Field Hospital 
 Elements of 243 (Wessex) Field Hospital 
 Elements of Tactical Medical Wing, RAFLaw enforcement 150 Provost Company, Royal Military Police
 Elements of 101 Provost Company Royal Military Police 
 Elements of 5th Regiment Royal Military Police 
 Elements of Special Investigations Branch (United Kingdom) 
 Elements of The Military Provost StaffOther units Elements of 1st Military Working Dog Regiment 
 Elements of 1 Military Intelligence Battalion 
 Elements of 2 Military Intelligence (Exploitation) Battalion 
 Elements of 4 Military Intelligence Battalion 
 Elements of The Military Stabilisation and Support Group 
 Elements of 15 Psychological Operations Group 
 Elements of The Defence Cultural Specialist Unit 
 Elements of 90 Signals Unit, Royal Air Force 
 Elements of 1 Air Control Centre, Royal Air Force 
 Elements of 33 (Engineering) Squadron, Royal Air Force 
 Elements of Tactical Supply Wing, Royal Air Force 
 Elements of 1 Air Mobility Wing, Royal Air Force 
 Elements of 2 (Mechanical Transport) Squadron, Royal Air Force 
 Elements of 93 (Expeditionary Armaments) Squadron, Royal Air Force 
 Elements of Engineering and Logistics Wing, Royal Air Force Odiham

Operation Herrick XVIII

May 2013 – October 2013:
 Deputy Commander, International Security Assistance Force: Major-General Nick Carter (May 2013 to July 2013)
 Deputy Commander, International Security Assistance Force: Major-General John Lorimer (July 2013 to October 2013)
HQ 1 Mechanized Brigade
215 Signal Squadron (Brigade Headquarters)
Campaign Signal Regiment: 3rd (United Kingdom) Division Headquarters and Signal Regiment (3DSR)
 British Forces Combat Camera Team
 EOD and Search Task Force
 Joint Fires and Targeting Group
 Operational Intelligence Support Group
 Rear Operations Group
 Transition Support Unit
 Transition Support Unit Lashkar Gah
 Transition Support Unit Nad-e Ali
 Transition Support Unit Nahr-e-SarajPrincipal Manoeuvre Units 2nd Royal Tank Regiment (Armoured)
 2nd Battalion, The Duke of Lancaster's Regiment (King's, Lancashire and Border) (Light Role Infantry) 
 1st Battalion, Royal Regiment of Fusiliers (Armoured Infantry)
 Y CompanyANA Mentoring BAG
 4th Battalion, The Rifles (Mechanized Infantry)ANP Mentoring PMAG
 The Royal Highland Fusiliers 2nd Battalion, Royal Regiment of Scotland (Light Role Infantry)Other units'''
 1st Battalion, Irish Guards 
 No. 2 Company (Brigade Operations Company)
 Brigade Reconnaissance Force
Household Cavalry Regiment (Formation Reconnaissance)
4 RIFLES Recce platoon
 Intelligence Surveillance Target Acquisition and Reconnaissance Group
 Unknown Squadron
 Royal Artillery
1st Regiment Royal Horse Artillery (Light Role Artillery)
Z Battery (Surveillance & Target Acquisition)
 Royal Engineers
22 Engineer Regiment
 Royal Electrical and Mechanical Engineers
6 (Close Support) Battalion REME
 Royal Signals
202 Signal Squadron
 Royal Logistic Corps
3 Logistic Support Regiment RLC
 Army Medical Services
5 Medical Regiment, Royal Army Medical Corps

Operation Herrick XIX

November 2013 - June 2014:
 Deputy Commander, International Security Assistance Force: Major-General John Lorimer (November 2013 to June 2014)
HQ 7 Armoured Brigade
207 Signal Squadron (Brigade Headquarters)
 Infantry
1st Battalion, Coldstream Guards
2nd Battalion, Royal Anglian Regiment (Light Role Infantry)
 C Company
3rd Battalion, Mercian Regiment (Armoured Infantry)
The Highlanders, 4th Battalion, Royal Regiment of Scotland (Armoured Infantry)
 Armour 
9th/12th Royal Lancers (Prince of Wales's) (Formation Reconnaissance)
The Royal Scots Dragoon Guards (Carabiniers and Greys) (Armoured)
 Royal Artillery
3rd Regiment Royal Horse Artillery (Light Role Artillery)
 OP Sterga 2
32nd Regiment Royal Artillery (UAV)
Elements of 5th Regiment Royal Artillery (STA)
 53 (Louisburg) Battery RA
 Royal Engineers
32 Engineer Regiment
 Royal Electrical and Mechanical Engineers
2 (Close Support) Battalion REME
 Royal Logistic Corps
2 Logistic Support Regiment RLC
 Army Medical Services
2nd Medical Regiment, Royal Army Medical Corps

Operation Herrick XX

June 2014 - December 2014:
 UK contingent commander: Brigadier James Swift (June 2014 - December 2014)
 Elements of 20th Armoured Brigade HQ
 HQ 102 Logistic Brigade
 Infantry 
 Elements of 1st Battalion, The Princess of Wales’s Royal Regiment
 2nd Battalion, The Rifles 
 5th Battalion, The Rifles
 Elements of 7th Battalion, The Rifles
 Armour 
 1st The Queen's Dragoon Guards
 Elements of the Queen's Royal Hussars
 Royal Artillery
 Elements of 5th Regiment K 'Hondeghem'  Bty
 26th Regiment
 Elements of 39th Regiment
 Elements of 47th Regiment 
 43 Battery Watchkeeper UAS
 Royal Engineers
 64 Works Group
 Elements of 33 Regiment (Explosive Ordnance Disposal)
 Elements of 35 Regiment
 Elements of 42 Regiment (Geographic)
 Royal Electrical and Mechanical Engineers
 3 Close Support Battalion
 Elements of 102 Battalion
 Royal Logistic Corps
 2 Operational Support Group
 1 Regiment
 Elements of 6 Regiment
 Elements of 7 Regiment
 Elements of 11 Explosive Ordnance Disposal Regiment
 Elements of 13 Air Assault Support Regiment
 Elements of 29 Regiment
 Elements of 150 (Yorkshire) Transport Regiment
 Elements of 159 Supply Regiment
 Elements of Headquarters Expeditionary Forces Institute and 148 (Expeditionary Forces Institute) Squadron
 Army Medical Services
 1st Armoured Medical Regiment Royal Army Medical Corps (RAMC)
 2nd Medical Brigade (United Kingdom) RAMC
 34 Field Hospital
 Elements of 1st Military Working Dog Regiment
 Royal Signals
 1st (United Kingdom) Armoured Division Headquarters and Signal Regiment
 Elements of 10 Regiment
 Elements of 14 Regiment (Electronic Warfare)
 Elements of 15 Regiment (Information Support)
 Elements of 30 Regiment
 Military Intelligence
 Elements of 1 Military Intelligence Battalion
 Elements of 2 Military Intelligence Battalion
 Elements of 4 Military Intelligence Battalion
 Police
 Elements of 1st Regiment RMP
 Elements of Special Investigation Branch (United Kingdom) RMP
 Elements of Close Protection Unit RMP
 No. 2 Tactical Police Squadron RAF
 Elements of the Military Provost Staff
 Royal Air Force
 No. 7 Force Protection Wing RAF (HQ)
 No. 15 Squadron RAF Regiment
 No. 34 Squadron RAF Regiment
 No. 609 Squadron Royal Auxiliary Air Force (RAuxAF)

Kabul Support Unit
 1st Battalion, Coldstream Guards from February 2014 to August 2014.
 HQ Company
 No. 1 Company
 No. 2 Company
 Elements of No. 4 (Support) Company

Logistic Support
Supporting the UK force is HQ Joint Force Support (Afghanistan)(JFSp(A)). This 1* headquarters has commands the: 
 Theatre Logistics Group
 Joint Movements Unit
 Reverse Supply Chain Squadron
 Reverse Support Chain Squadron
 Transport Troop
 Vehicle Replenishment Section
 Theatre Provost Group
 Theatre Medical Group
 Theatre Equipment Support Group
 Joint Helicopter Support Unit
 Equipment Support Company
 Redeployment Platoon

Stabilisation Teams
 Military Stabilisation Support Team 
 Lashkar Gah District Stabilisation Team

References

Citations

Bibliography

War on Terror orders of battle

British Army deployments
21st-century military history of the United Kingdom